Hoplocercidae are a family of lizards native to the tropical forests, woodlands and savanna-like habitats of Central and South America. Alternatively they are recognized as a subfamily, Hoplocercinae. 20 species in three genera are described.

Species

Family: Hoplocercidae
 Genus Enyalioides
 Enyalioides altotambo Torres-Carvajal, Venegas, & de Queiroz, 2015 – Alto Tambo woodlizard
 Enyalioides anisolepis Torres-Carvajal, Venegas, & de Queiroz, 2015 – rough-scaled woodlizard
 Enyalioides azulae Venegas, Torres-Carvajal, Duran, & de Queiroz, 2013
 Enyalioides binzayedi Venegas, Torres-Carvajal, Duran, & de Queiroz, 2013
 Enyalioides cofanorum Duellman, 1973 – Cofan woodlizard, Duellman's dwarf iguana 
 Enyalioides feiruzae Venegas, Chávez, García-Ayachi, Duran, & Torres-Carvajal, 2021
 Enyalioides heterolepis (Bocourt, 1874) – Bocourt's dwarf iguana  
 Enyalioides laticeps (Guichenot, 1855) –  broad-headed woodlizard, Guichenot's dwarf iguana
 Enyalioides microlepis (O'Shaughnessy, 1881) – small-scaled woodlizard, tiny-scale dwarf iguana
 Enyalioides oshaughnessyi (Boulenger, 1881) – red-eyed woodlizard, O'Shaughnessy's dwarf iguana
 Enyalioides palpebralis (Boulenger, 1883) – horned woodlizard, Boulenger's dwarf iguana
 Enyalioides praestabilis (O'Shaughnessy, 1881) – blue-spotted woodlizard
 Enyalioides rubrigularis Torres-Carvajal, de Queiroz, & Etheridge, 2009 – red-throated woodlizard
 Enyalioides rudolfarndti Venegas, Duran, Landauro, & Lujan, 2011
 Enyalioides sophiarothschildae Torres-Carvajal, Venegas, & de Queiroz, 2015 – Rothschild's woodlizard
 Enyalioides touzeti Torres-Carvajal, Almendáriz, Valencia, Yúnez-Muñoz, & Reyes, 2008 – Touzet's woodlizard
 Genus Hoplocercus
 Hoplocercus spinosus Fitzinger, 1843 – spiny weapontail
 Genus Morunasaurus
 Morunasaurus annularis (O'Shaughnessy, 1881) – ringed manticore, ringed spinytail iguana 
 Morunasaurus groi Dunn, 1933 – Gro's manticore, Dunn's spinytail iguana
 Morunasaurus peruvianus Köhler, 2003 – Cenepa manticore

References

 Frost, D.E. & Etheridge, R.E. 1989. A Phylogenetic Analysis and Taxonomy of Iguanian Lizards (Reptilia: Squamata) Univ. Kansas Mus. Nat. Hist. Misc. Publ. 81.

Further reading
 

 
Lizard families
Lizards of Central America
Lizards of South America
Taxa named by Darrel Frost
Taxa named by Richard Emmett Etheridge